The 1926 Indiana Hoosiers football team represented the Indiana Hoosiers in the 1926 Big Ten Conference football season as members of the Big Ten Conference. The Hoosiers played their home games at Memorial Stadium in Bloomington, Indiana. The team was coached by Harlan Page, in his first year as head coach.

Schedule

References

Indiana
Indiana Hoosiers football seasons
Indiana Hoosiers football